Universal history is the presentation of the history of humankind as a whole, as a coherent unit.

Universal History may also refer to:

Jami' al-tawarikh, 14th-century work of literature and history, produced by the Mongol Ilkhanate in Persia
Universal History (Sale et al), 18th-century history book

See also
World history (disambiguation)
History of the world (disambiguation)